(P.77) is a musical setting of the  sequence, composed by Giovanni Battista Pergolesi in 1736.

Background
Pergolesi composed it during his final illness from tuberculosis in a Franciscan monastery in Pozzuoli, along with a  setting, and, as it is said, finished it right before he died.

Reception

The  is one of Pergolesi's most celebrated sacred works, achieving great popularity after the composer's death. Jean-Jacques Rousseau showed appreciation for the work, praising the opening movement as "the most perfect and touching duet to come from the pen of any composer". Many composers adapted the work, including Giovanni Paisiello, who extended the orchestral accompaniment, and Joseph Eybler, who added a choir to replace some of the duets. Bach's  is a parody cantata based on Pergolesi's composition.

The work was not without its detractors. Padre Martini criticised its light, operatic style in 1774, and believed it was too similar to Pergolesi's comic opera  to adequately deliver the pathos of the text.

Structure

Much of the music is based on Pergolesi's earlier setting of the  sequence.

"", F minor, common time; duet
"", C minor, 3/8; soprano aria
"", G minor, common time; duet
"", E-flat major, 2/4; alto aria
"", C minor, common time; duet
—"", C minor, 6/8
"", F minor, common time; soprano aria
"", C minor, 3/8; alto aria
"", G minor, cut common time; duet
"", E-flat major, common time; duet
"", G minor, common time; alto aria
"", B-flat major, common time; duet
"", F minor, common time; duet
—"Amen..." , F minor, cut common time

Recordings

References

Further reading
 
 Richard Wagner's  of Pergolesi's Stabat Mater: 
 An IMSLP-hosted scan of Pergolesi's manuscript, viewed here 15.6MB

External links
 
 
 Pergolesi Stabat Mater Video of a historical performance of the Stabat Mater on original instruments by the ensemble Voices of Music using original baroque instruments.

Pergolesi
1736 compositions
Compositions by Giovanni Battista Pergolesi